AD Renting (All-Drie Renting), often simply called ADR, was a Belgian professional cycling team that existed from 1987 to 1989.

Tour de France

Despite its short history and lack of funds, the team was very successful in the Tour de France. Eddy Planckaert
won the points classification in 1988 to go with the victory he achieved in the highly regarded monument the Tour of Flanders earlier that year. In that same spring campaign, Dirk Demol won the Paris–Roubaix after a breakaway of 222 kilometers.

The biggest success however was when Greg LeMond, a new signing, won the 1989 Tour de France with the team, taking three stage victories in the process.

Major wins

1988
 Paris–Roubaix, Dirk Demol
 Tour of Flanders, Eddy Planckaert
 Points Classification Tour de France, Eddy Planckaert
1989
 E3-Prijs Vlaanderen, Eddy Planckaert
 Vuelta a España, stage 1, Marnix Lameire
 Vuelta a España, stage 5, Eddy Planckaert
 Overall Tour de France, Greg LeMond
Stages 5, 19 & 21, Greg LeMond
 Road race, UCI Road World Championships, Greg LeMond

References

External links

Cycling teams based in Belgium
Defunct cycling teams based in Belgium
1987 establishments in Belgium
1989 disestablishments in Belgium
Cycling teams established in 1987
Cycling teams disestablished in 1989